Jessica Deglau (born May 27, 1980) was a member of the Canadian Olympic team in swimming in the 1996 and 2000 Olympic Games.  Deglau swam for the Vancouver Pacific Swim Club in her youth, until becoming a member of the national team.  In addition to swimming on the national team, she swam for and graduated from the University of British Columbia.

The Vancouver native first broke the Canadian record in the 200-meter butterfly at the 1996 Olympics clocking 2:11.68 for sixth spot and bettered it two years later at the world championships, again finishing sixth.

However, in the 200-metre butterfly at the 1999 Pan American Games, Deglau went under the magic 2:10 barrier clocking 2:09.64, a time that would have earned her the silver medal at the 1996 Games and a bronze at the 1998 worlds.  It was the second fastest time in the world in 1999 behind Australian world and Olympic champion Susie O'Neill's 2:07.35.

Deglau won the 1996 Elaine Tanner Award, presented annually to Canada's outstanding junior female athlete.  She also won a 2003 Sport BC Athlete of the Year Award and a 2003 Premier's Athletic Award for swimming as an outstanding British Columbia athlete, and was honored as "one of the greatest swimmers in Canadian Interuniversity Sport CIS history."  During her collegiate swimming career she amassed a total of 29 medals, the highest total in the history of UBC.  Deglau was chosen CIS Female Swimmer of the Year in 1998-99 and 1999–2000.  On April 3, 2013, Deglau was inducted into the UBC Sports Hall of Fame.

Jessica Deglau is a distant relative of prominent photographer Terry Deglau.

See also
 List of Commonwealth Games medallists in swimming (women)

References

External links

1980 births
Living people
Canadian female butterfly swimmers
Canadian female freestyle swimmers
Olympic swimmers of Canada
Swimmers at the 1996 Summer Olympics
Swimmers at the 1999 Pan American Games
Swimmers at the 2000 Summer Olympics
Swimmers from Vancouver
UBC Thunderbirds swimmers
Commonwealth Games bronze medallists for Canada
Pan American Games gold medalists for Canada
Pan American Games silver medalists for Canada
Swimmers at the 1998 Commonwealth Games
Swimmers at the 2002 Commonwealth Games
Commonwealth Games medallists in swimming
Pan American Games medalists in swimming
Medalists at the 1999 Pan American Games
21st-century Canadian women
Medallists at the 1998 Commonwealth Games
Medallists at the 2002 Commonwealth Games